"We've Got Tonite" is a song written by American rock music artist Bob Seger, from his album Stranger in Town (1978). The single record charted twice for Seger, and was developed from a prior song that he had written. Further versions charted in 1983 for Kenny Rogers as a duet with Sheena Easton, and again in 2002 for Ronan Keating.

Original version

Background
The song developed from an earlier Seger composition titled "This Old House" which featured the same chords as "We've Got Tonite" although the earlier song had a slightly different melody. Seger overhauled "This Old House" into "We've Got Tonite" the day after seeing the film The Sting (1973) which features a conversation between the Robert Redford character and a woman he is attracted to, played by Dimitra Arliss, who says: "I don't even know you." Redford's response, "You know me. It's two in the morning and I don't know nobody," caused an emotional response in Seger, manifested in the overhauled song lyrics.

"We've Got Tonite" was not recorded until the 1976 sessions for Seger's album Night Moves and was held off that album as Seger felt it was not a thematic fit. It was one of five Stranger... tracks recorded at Muscle Shoals Sound Studios with the Muscle Shoals Rhythm Section, and  Venetta Fields, Clydie King, and Shirley Matthews provided the backing vocals.

"We've Got Tonite" served as the album's third single, reaching No. 13 on the US pop chart in 1978. It also played in the background of Melissa Sue Anderson's television film Survival of Dana (1979), in a scene where Anderson's character was in Los Angeles visiting the home of new friends and was in a room with co-star Robert Carradine's character Donny Davis, with whom she was falling in love. In the UK, the original version would chart twice, reaching No. 41 in 1979, then No. 22 as a 1995 re-release—as "We've Got Tonight"—to promote a Greatest Hits album. (In 1982, a live version—titled "We've Got Tonite"—from the in-concert album Nine Tonight reached No. 60 in the UK.)

Since the death of his mother Charlotte, Seger has made a point of always including "We've Got Tonite" in his live setlist, as it was her favorite of his compositions.

Personnel
Credits are adapted from the liner notes of Seger's 1994 Greatest Hits compilation.
Bob Seger – lead vocals

Muscle Shoals Rhythm Section
Barry Beckett – keyboards
Pete Carr – lead guitar
Jimmy Johnson – rhythm guitar
David Hood – bass guitar
Roger Hawkins – drums, percussion

Additional musicians
Venetta Fields – background vocals
Clydie King – background vocals
Sherlie Matthews – background vocals
Jim Ed Norman – string arrangement

Reception
Billboard described "We've Got Tonite" as a "melodic ballad featuring Seger's smokey and tender vocal" and said that the structure of the melody was similar to Rod Stewart's "Tonight's the Night".  Cash Box called it a "sensitive ballad" with "stark opening tambourine beat, strings and strong upward swell" and praised Seger's vocals as well as the "brightness" provided by the backing vocals. Record World said that "The drama builds beautifully and Seger's raspy vocals carry the message with ease."

Charts

Weekly charts

Year-end charts

Kenny Rogers and Sheena Easton version

Background
In 1983, American country-pop star Kenny Rogers recorded the song as a duet with Scottish pop star Sheena Easton, and made it the title track of his album We've Got Tonight. Both Rogers and Easton were on the roster of EMI America-Liberty Records and their collaboration on "We've Got Tonight" was at the firm suggestion of label chairman Larry Mazza who hoped to restore Easton to chart ascendancy. Mazza was also the president of Capitol Records the label of release for the Bob Seger original. Rogers stated: "I liked the idea of recording with Sheena. I thought the contrast in styles--I'm so throaty and she's so trained and pure--would really work well." Rogers himself phoned Easton to pitch their duet on December 23, 1982. The two singers then met up on Christmas Eve to rehearse the song with a piano, six days later going into the studio, with the completed track going to radio nine days later.

Easton would assert that it was the song choice which appealed to her, while allowing Rogers to be "a good singer with a distinctive voice" who she found "always helpful and co-operative" in the studio, debunking insider reports that the ten-day recording session for the track was a stormy one with Rogers overtly disliking Easton's high-pitched vocals. Easton's contribution to the track would prove a bone of critical contention.

Reception
Billboard said that the song "gets a full production treatment, building on the contrast between two such distinctive and familiar voices." Rolling Stone critic Chris Connelly would dismiss the Easton/Rogers duet of "We've Got Tonight" as "shrieking [and] insensitive", and Jerseyite critic Jim Bohen would lament how Rogers "who usually sounds good duetting with women" was defeated by her nails-across-the-blackboard voice. But Dennis Hunt (Los Angeles Times) would prefer the Rogers/Easton take to the Seger original due to a "very appealing" "blend of sharply contrasting voices, his deep and hers very high," adding that "Rogers, never known for his vocal power, stretches to match Easton, [attaining] his finest vocal performance." And AllMusic critic Joe Viglione would opine that Easton's "splendid voice reaching the high registers over Kenny's familiar monotone...really makes [the track] special."

A number one hit on the Billboard Country Singles chart, "We've Got Tonight" reached number six on the Billboard Hot 100 pop singles chart, and number two on the Billboard Adult Contemporary chart, also reaching the top 30 in the United Kingdom. Rebranded as a country & western song due to Rogers, "We've Got Tonight" would be honored by ASCAP as the Most Performed Country Song of 1983, with Seger, an iconic Detroit rocker, personally acknowledging the honor by attending the October 1984 ASCAP Country Music Awards fête held at the Opryland Hotel in Nashville.

In Brazil the single has exceeded 100,000 copies.

Personnel
 Kenny Rogers – lead vocals
 Sheena Easton – lead vocals
 Paul Jackson Jr., Marty Walsh – guitars 
 David Foster – acoustic and electric pianos 
 Nathan East – bass guitar
 Michael Baird – drums
 Jeremy Lubbock – string arrangement
 Humberto Gatica – engineer

Charts

Weekly charts

Year-end charts

Ronan Keating duet version

Background
"We've Got Tonight" was remade by Irish singer Ronan Keating and Scottish singer Lulu for Lulu's twelfth studio album, Together (2002), with the track also appearing on Keating's second studio album, Destination (2002). The Together album, consisting of tracks pairing Lulu with a variety of "name" duet partners, was a comeback vehicle for Lulu designed by top entertainment impresario Louis Walsh, whom the singer had signed on with in 2000. Three of the acts the album paired Lulu with—Samantha Mumba, Westlife, and Keating—were protégées of Walsh; however, Keating has said that Lulu herself recruited him to duet with her, stating, "I said 'Yeah, as long as you let me pick the song!' I picked...one of my all-time favorite love songs."

Both the Together and Destination albums were released in the spring of 2002; it was decided to forego any single releases of off Together, but after two earlier singles, Keating's label Polydor issued "We've Got Tonight"—credited to Ronan Keating featuring Lulu—on November 25, 2002, and it debuted at its No. 4 peak on the UK Singles Chart on December 1, 2002. The track was also an international hit, reaching No. 7 in the Netherlands, No. 10 in Ireland, No. 12 in Australia, and No. 14 in Flanders.

Polydor Records decided to release a reformatted version of the track that replaced Lulu with Jeanette Biedermann, a Polydor artist who had enjoyed considerable success with English-language releases in her native Germany, Austria, and Switzerland. This version of the duet was issued in those three nations with top-ten peaks in Austria and Germany and a No. 25 peak in Switzerland. In Italy, the track was issued with Italian soul singer Giorgia Todrani and published as the B-side of Giorgia's single "Gocce di memoria". In the Philippines, Keating performed the song with Kyla.

Track listings
UK single
 "We've Got Tonight" (featuring Lulu) – 3:39
 "All I Have Is My Heart" – 3:50
 "In the Ghetto" (Live) – 3:13
 "We've Got Tonight" (Video) – 4:15

German single
 "We've Got Tonight" (featuring Jeanette) – 3:39
 "Sea of Love" – 3:14
 "All I Have Is My Heart" – 3:50
 "In the Ghetto" (Live) – 3:13

Italian single
 "We've Got Tonight" (featuring Giorgia) – 3:39
 "All I Have Is My Heart" – 3:50

Charts

Ronan Keating and Lulu
Weekly charts

Year-end charts

Ronan Keating and Jeanette
Weekly charts

Year-end charts

Certifications

Release history

Other versions
"We've Got Tonight" played in the background of Melissa Sue Anderson's television film Survival of Dana (1979), in a scene where Anderson's character was in Los Angeles visiting the home of new friends and was in a room with co-star Robert Carradine's character Donny Davis, with whom she was falling in love. In Season 4, episode 4 of the television series Ray Donovan, Liev Schreiber sings a karaoke version of the song, then a reprise to his wife as the episode ends.

The song has also been recorded by Rein Alexander (a duet with Trine Rein, album Song For You, 2007), Bill Anderson (album Nashville Mirrors, 1980), Anne Lise (album First Dance, 2006), Patti Austin (album Body Language, 1980), Shirley Bassey (album, The Show Must Go On 1996), Elkie Brooks (album Nor More the Fool, 1986 & 1987 UK chart single, No. 67), Rhonda Burchmore (album Midnight Rendezvous, 2001), Rita Coolidge (as "Tonite", a duet with Jermaine Jackson) (album Never Let You Go, 1983), Nianell (with Dozi, album It Takes Two, 2009), Allison Durbin (album Country Love Songs, 1983), Ray Dylan (duet with Charlize Berg, album Goeie Ou Country in Duet, 2013), Adam Harvey & Beccy Cole (album The Great Country Song Book Volume II, 2017),Richie Havens (album Connections, 1980), Steven Houghton (album Steven Houghton, 1997), Tom Jones (album Mr Jones, 2002), Reg Livermore (album Livermore's Firing Squad, 1983), Barry Manilow (album Summer of '78, 1996), Jane McDonald (album The Singer of Your Song, 2014), Melanie (album Moments From My Life, 2002), Angelika Milster (duet with Steve Barton, album Ich bin wie ich bin, 1984), Chord Overstreet (multi-artist album Muscle Shoals...Small Town, Big Sound, 2018), Marti Pellow (album Love to Love, 2011), Tex Perkins & His Ladyboyz (album No.1's & No.2's, 2008), Lee Towers & Anita Meyer (album Run to Me, 1985), Conway Twitty (as "Tonite") (album Heart & Soul, 1980), and Dottie West (as "Tonite") (album Special Delivery, 1980)

American Idol Season 11 contestant and eventual winner Phillip Phillips performed "We've Got Tonight" on the series episode broadcast May 16, 2012; his studio recording of the song appeared on the Billboard Hot 100 at number 97.

Sheena Easton also recorded a Spanish-language version of "We've Got Tonight" entitled "La Noche Y Tú" on her 1984 Spanish-language album Todo Me Recuerda A Ti, the track being a duet with Dyango. The song has also been rendered in Italian as "Grazie perché", by Amii Stewart and Gianni Morandi, a No. 5 hit in Italy in 1984; and in Czech as "Všímej si víc", recorded in 1983 by Věra Špinarová and Karel Černoch. Another Czech rendering of the song, "Čas dál nech spát", was recorded in 2012 by David Deyl and Helena Vondráčková, being a new track included on Vondráčková's 3-CD compilation Helena (nejen) o lásce.

References

1978 singles
1978 songs
1983 singles
1985 singles
2002 singles
Barry Manilow songs
Bob Seger songs
Capitol Records singles
Columbia Records singles
Dottie West songs
Elkie Brooks songs
Kenny Loggins songs
Kenny Rogers songs
Liberty Records singles
Lulu (singer) songs
Male–female vocal duets
Number-one singles in Scotland
Polydor Records singles
Ronan Keating songs
Sheena Easton songs
Song recordings produced by Bob Seger
Song recordings produced by David Foster
Songs written by Bob Seger